Phoenix Seminary is an interdenominational Evangelical Christian seminary in Scottsdale, Arizona.

History
It was founded in 1988 as a branch campus of Western Seminary and became independent in 2004.

Academics
Phoenix Seminary is accredited by the Association of Theological Schools in the United States and Canada and the Higher Learning Commission. The Arizona State Board of Private Postsecondary Education has licensed Phoenix Seminary to offer the Master of Arts in Counseling degree.

The seminary offers several degrees, including: Master of Divinity (M.Div.), Master of Arts (MA) in Biblical and Theological Studies, Master of Arts in Counseling, Master of Arts in Ministry, Master of Theology (Th.M.), and Doctor of Ministry (D.Min.). The seminary partners with Ottawa University in a Master of Arts in Professional Counseling program. The seminary also offers a Graduate Diploma in Biblical Studies.

Campus
Classes were held at the former Scottsdale, Arizona, campus from 2000 through 2005. In 2005, Phoenix Seminary purchased and moved its campus to a new building in central Phoenix. In 2017, the seminary moved to a new campus in Scottsdale, Arizona.

Research
In 2019, Phoenix Seminary founded the Text & Canon Institute (TCI) to foster academic biblical research, resource the Church, and mentor ThM students. In 2021, the TCI became the host for the Hexapla Institute, which is a cooperative venture between University of Oxford, Vrije Universiteit Amsterdam, and the Hexapla Project and is committed to producing a new critical edition of the remains of Origen’s Hexapla. The first volume of the new series was published in 2020 by Phoenix Seminary professor John Meade as A Critical Edition of the Hexaplaric Fragments of Job 22–42.

Notable faculty
Notable faculty members at Phoenix Seminary include:
 Wayne Grudem
 Peter J. Gentry

References

External links
 
Text & Canon Institute

Evangelical seminaries and theological colleges
Seminaries and theological colleges in Arizona
Universities and colleges in Phoenix, Arizona
Educational institutions established in 1987
1987 establishments in Arizona